Ashizuri may refer to:
 Ashizuri (train), a train service in Japan
4399 Ashizuri, a main-belt asteroid
Ashizuri-Uwakai National Park, a national park at the southwestern tip of the island of Shikoku, Japan
Ashizuri-class combat support ship, a class of Imperial Japanese Navy support ships of World War II
Cape Ashizuri, the southernmost point of the island of Shikoku, Japan